Sphenophorus piceus is a species of palm weevils in the family Curculionidae.

Description 

Distribution and habitat 
This species is widespread from the southern part of Central Europe to the Mediterranean and central Asia. These beetles live on marshy meadows, wet pastures, ponds and lakes.

References 

 Biolib
 Fauna Europaea
 Encyclopaedia of Life
 Coleoptera Poloniae
 Zipcodezoo

Dryophthorinae
Beetles described in 1776
Beetles of Asia
Taxa named by Peter Simon Pallas